Bhooloham is a 2015 Indian sports action film directed by N. Kalyanakrishnan and produced by Aascar Films. It stars Jayam Ravi and Trisha, while Nathan Jones and Prakash Raj play pivotal roles as antagonists.

The film, which began during 2011, had been in its post-production stage for a long period and was released on 24 December 2015, after a long delay. It received mixed reviews from audience but was a successful venture.

Plot 
There are two rival factions of boxing in North Madras: Irumbu Manithar Rasamanickam and Nattu Marunthu Vaathiyar. The IMR boxer Mariappan's son is Arumugam, and the NMV boxer Munusamy's son is Bhooloham. Now, in the present, the IMR boxer is Arumugam (I. S. Rajesh), while the NMV boxer is Bhooloham (Jayam Ravi).

Bhooloham has a severe grudge against Arumugam because Mariappan had defeated Munusamy in a boxing match. Unable to bear this loss, Munusamy kills himself. Bhooloham wants to avenge his father's death by killing Arumugam in the match. This rivalry is being used by Deepak Shah (Prakash Raj), an intelligent TV CEO, to make money through his FSC (Future Sports Channel) Independent Boxing Cup. Deepak exploits the boxers' innocence and makes them fight to gain TRPs. In the inaugural Match of IBC, Bhooloham hits Arumugam to the extent that he goes into a coma.

Bhooloham later realizes his mistake and becomes a Saamiyar (saintly person). He gets a job in his love interest Sindhu's (Trisha Krishnan) college as a waiter. Meanwhile, Deepak, who is hell bent on fixing Bhooloham's match with Destroyer Gurudayal (Arpit Ranka), hatches a conspiracy. Bhooloham, who desperately needs money to fund Arumugam's operation, falls prey to Deepak's plan. As Bhooloham hits Dayal after the match is over, he loses the match. Unable to bear Bhooloham's loss, his coach Rathinam Master (Ponvannan) commits suicide by consuming poison.

Meanwhile, Deepak plans to bring an American based psychotic boxer Steven George (Nathan Jones) to kill Dayal as to increase the TRPs of the channel. When Dayal tries to leave the tournament, Deepak threatens him that he will kill his family. Under pressure, Dayal lodges a complaint against Deepak in the Boxing Union. There, Bhooloham declares that he will fight against Steven, not to show his supremacy, but to expose Deepak's wrongdoings. He reveals that Rathinam was being pressured by Deepak for entering into the ring against Dayal, and when Bhooloham gets defeated, Deepak deceives him. The Union supports Bhooloham, and they make a plan that Steven will declare that he will fight against Bhooloham. The plan succeeds, and Deepak, though reluctant, has to go to the Union Office for signing Bhooloham for the fight.

The agreement which Deepak poses against Bhooloham is partially rejected by Bhooloham, As Bhooloham correctly predicted the intention of Deepak to make exorbitant profit and pass the earning from the sports channel only to deepak's clan & deprive  Bhooloham of their due share of profit earned from boxing,  Bhooloham openly opposes this cunning plan of Deepak in the union office  & strictly advises Deepak that he will participate in the upcoming match with Steven George only if international referee is present in the ring. Due to the potential of the match for immense profit  Deepak, though reluctant, is forced to sign on the agreement created by Bhooloham and the Boxing Union.This incident annoyed Deepak so he  cunningly planned to take revenge by killing Bhooloham. After signing the agreement, Deepak tells Steven that he will give Steven his lifetime earnings in a single match if he kills Bhooloham using a foul punch. Steven agrees to this condition and practices hard for the match.

The match happens, and surprisingly to Deepak's shock, Bhooloham wins the match as he does not stop the match when Steven hits the foul punch & partly due to the encouragement & advice given by Arumugam to hit Steven George near the hip bone, due to which Steven George lost his strength.  After the match, Bhooloham exposes Deepak's wrongdoings. As a result, the Future Sports Channel is sealed for a lifetime, and Deepak is jailed for his malpractices.

Cast

Production 
Jayam Ravi agreed terms to star in the film in August 2010, shortly after he had begun work for Engeyum Kadhal (2011) and Aadhi Baghavan (2013). During the making of the Peranmai (2009), Kalyanakrishnan, who was an assistant director to S. P. Jananathan, had narrated the story of the film and Ravi agreed to give priority dates for the film. However, delays in production of the former two films resulted in the postponement of the shoot of Bhooloham. This was due to the character in Aadhi Bhagavan requiring Ravi to sport a beard, which stopped him from working on films simultaneously. In July 2011, it was reported that Jayam Ravi underwent a special training course in boxing for his role as a boxer with professional athlete, Prasad, overseeing his progress.

Amala Paul was approached by the producers in March 2012 to play the leading female role, but could not allot dates for the film. Subsequently, the team approached Nayantara to play the lead role but her unavailability saw the team agree terms with Trisha to play a role in the film. The film is inspired from the life of a real life Asian boxing champion named Madhan. The makers hired the Australian actor of Troy fame, Nathan Jones, for a fight sequence.

The film primarily shot in late 2012 and early 2013, and the makers worked towards a release date during the summer of 2013. Still, the film experienced further delays. Producer Aascar Ravichandran was unhappy about the film having more than half an hour dedicated to boxing scenes and put the film on hold, in order to edit the film's content. In early 2015, the Indian Overseas Bank's Sriram Nagar branch filed a petition in The Debt Recovery Tribunal (DRT), Chennai and requested to an interim stay on the film after Aascar Ravichandran failed to repay the loan amount he bought for the production expense of Bhooloham.

Soundtrack 
Music was composed by Srikanth Deva, uniting with Jayam Ravi for the second time after M Kumaran S/O Mahalakshmi.

Release 
The satellite rights of the film were sold to Jaya TV.
After about three years of delay, the film was scheduled and got released on 24 December 2015. A new trailer was also released on 15 December 2015. The film was later dubbed and released in Hindi as Bhaigiri 2 by Goldmines Telefilms Pvt Ltd in 2018.

Critical reception 
Indiaglitz rated the film 3 out of 5 and wrote, "All said, the movie is a good entertainer of sorts, watch it for Jayam Ravi's heavy duty thara local gimmicks and some guaranteed good boxing sequences."

Deccan Chronicle rated the film 3 out of 5 and wrote, "The movie will definitely get your adrenaline glands flowing. Watch it for Jayam Ravi’s extraordinary effort!"

References

External links 

2010s sports films
2010s Tamil-language films
2015 action drama films
2015 films
Cross-dressing in Indian films
Films scored by Srikanth Deva
Indian action films
Indian boxing films
Sports action films